London Central Elementary High School (LCEHS), formerly London Central High School, was a United States Department of Defense Dependents School (DoDDS) in the Isles District of DoDDS Europe for pupils in kindergarten through grade 12. It operated from 1952 until 2007, with its first graduating class in 1953.

In about 2005 the average number of students was 360 and there were at least 75 students boarding. Students originated from the United States and Canada, with most students being in military families; those from non-military families paid tuition fees. The school had a high rate of students enrolling or transferred away due to job changes. Students living in dormitories, which served grades 9-12, had parents doing military duties or other duties for the U.S. federal government in remote areas in other countries.

LCEHS fell under the command of the U.S. Naval Activities, United Kingdom (COMNAVACTUK).

History
London Central High School (commonly known as "LCHS" or just "Central") was established in 1952 at Bushy Park, in north west London, for students in grades 7 through 12. Subsequent base closures led to two moves: to Bushey Hall in 1962, and to RAF Daws Hill, its final location, in 1971.

For the 2006–07 school year, LCHS merged with West Ruislip Elementary School, which had closed in the spring of 2006. Consequently, it accommodated grades K-12 and "elementary" was added to the school's name. At the time of its closing, LCEHS was the last remaining DoDDS school with dormitories.

The USNAVEUR Headquarters were relocated from London to Naples, Italy in 2007. As a result, RAF Daws Hill, along with other naval installations in the area, was scaled down and eventually closed. LCHS staged a formal closing ceremony on May 15, 2007 and locked its doors for the last time in June 2007, with a handover of keys back to the US Navy/RAF on 30 June. The website was completely removed in mid-June 2014.

Facilities
Male students lived in Mansfield Hall while female students lived in Trinity Hall.

Notable students
 Charles Baker, actor
 Gerry Beckley, co-founder of the band America
 Bo Bice, singer
 Dewey Bunnell, co-founder of the band America
 Jerry Donahue, guitarist and producer
 Charles Easley, Mississippi Supreme Court Judge 
 William Frederick Fisher, NASA astronaut and physician
 Megan McArthur, NASA astronaut and oceanographer 
 Paul Miller, Canadian actor
 Dan Peek, co-founder of the band America
 Doc Rosser, former keyboardist for John Mellencamp and convicted felon 
 Dale Van Atta, columnist

A book about London Central High School entitled From the Faculty Lounge was published in 2008. It features memories of the school in all three of its locations from around 35 former principals, teachers and staff.

Notes and references

External links
 Archived official websites
 (after December 31, 2004)

LCHS alumni website
Photos of West Ruislip Elementary

1951 establishments in England
2007 disestablishments in England
American international schools in the United Kingdom
Bushy Park
Defunct boarding schools in England
Defunct schools in Buckinghamshire
Defunct schools in Hertfordshire
Defunct schools in the London Borough of Richmond upon Thames
Educational institutions disestablished in 2007
Educational institutions established in 1951
High Wycombe
History of the United States Army in the United Kingdom
International schools in London
United States Department of Defense